Mount Patterson is a peak in the Waputik Range of the Canadian Rockies. It is located within Banff National Park in Alberta of Western Canada. Mount Patterson stands across the Mistaya River Valley from Mount Weed, and both are prominent features seen from the Icefields Parkway. Its nearest higher peak is Howse Peak,  to the northwest.

It was named in 1917 after John Duncan Patterson who was president of the Alpine Club of Canada from 1914 to 1920.

Geology

Like other mountains in Banff Park, Mount Patterson is composed of sedimentary rock laid down during the Precambrian to Jurassic periods. Formed in shallow seas, this sedimentary rock was pushed east and over the top of younger rock during the Laramide orogeny.

Climate

Based on the Köppen climate classification, Mount Patterson is located in a subarctic climate zone with cold, snowy winters, and mild summers. Winter temperatures can drop below  with wind chill factors below . Precipitation runoff from Mount Patterson drains into the Mistaya River which is a tributary of the Saskatchewan River.

Gallery

See also
List of mountains of Canada

References

External links

 Parks Canada web site: Banff National Park
 Mount Patterson photo: Flickr

Three-thousanders of Alberta
Alberta's Rockies
Mountains of Banff National Park